S. americanus may refer to:
 Samolus americanus, a water rose species
 Schoenoplectus americanus, a bulrush species
 Scyllarus americanus, a lobster species in the genus Scyllarus
 Siphonorhis americanus, a bird species
 Spondylus americanus, an oyster species in the genus Spondylus
 Styrax americanus, a snowbell species in the genus Styrax
 Symbion americanus, a microscopic symbiote of the American lobster in the genus Symbion

See also
 Americanus (disambiguation)